These are the Billboard Hot 100 number-one singles of 1972.

That year, 18 acts earned their first number one song, such as Don McLean, Al Green, Nilsson, Neil Young, America, Roberta Flack, The Chi-Lites, The Staple Singers, Sammy Davis Jr., Bill Withers, Gilbert O'Sullivan, Looking Glass, Mac Davis, Chuck Berry, Johnny Nash, Helen Reddy, and Billy Paul. Michael Jackson, having previously hit number one with The Jackson 5, also earns his first number one song as a solo act.

Chart history

Number-one artists

See also
1972 in music

Sources
Fred Bronson's Billboard Book of Number 1 Hits, 5th Edition
Joel Whitburn's Top Pop Singles 1955-2008, 12 Edition
Joel Whitburn Presents the Billboard Hot 100 Charts: The Seventies
Additional information obtained can be verified within Billboard's online archive services and print editions of the magazine.

References

1972 record charts
1972